Nan Lurie (1906–1985) was an American printmaker and engraver (born in Odessa) known for 1930s works about racism and about the daily life of African Americans. 

She studied with Yasuo Kuniyoshi at the Art Students League. She married Kenneth Fearing on June 18, 1945.

She was a member of the Federal Art Project in New York City from 1935 to 1942.

Her work is held by the Smithsonian American Art Museum.

Works 
Despair lithograph, n.d.
Old Tales lithograph, n.d.
Sand Yard lithograph, n.d.
Sandyard lithograph, n.d.
Speaker lithograph, n.d.
Subway Bootblack lithograph, 1935-1943
Subway Scene lithograph, n.d.
Sunday Afternoon lithograph, n.d.
Women's House of Detention print, 1936-1939
 Technological Improvements, print, 1936-1939
 Next, lithograph, 1936-1939

References

External links 
 Nan Lurie, The Metropolitan Museum of Art
 Nan Lurie works for sale
 Nan Lurie, Art Institute of Chicago
 Nan Lurie (American, 1910), artnet
Nan Lurie, Smithsonian American Art Museum

1910 births
1985 deaths
Federal Art Project artists
20th-century American women artists